The Vedeggio is a river of the Swiss Canton Ticino which rises on the slopes of Monte Camoghè (2200m) between Bellinzona and Lugano, crosses the plain of Vedeggio (which takes its name from the river), and enters Lake Lugano at Agno. Its final section, from the outskirts of Agno until its emission into Lake Lugano has been cut into a straight channel for ease of civil planning in the town.

Rivers of Ticino
Rivers of Switzerland